Chenaru (also Romanized as Chenārū; also known as Chenārū Abolḩasan) is a village in Kavirat Rural District, Chatrud District, Kerman County, Kerman Province, Iran. At the 2006 census, its population was 33, in 10 families.

References 

Populated places in Kerman County